Tenderfoot is a Canadian short dramatic dance film, directed by Roger Boire and released in 1988. The film stars Massimo Agostinelli as a window washer cleaning the windows at a dance school, who becomes fascinated by the dancers and begins to imagine himself participating in dance routines with them; eventually he is drawn in for real, when his bucket is stolen and he has to participate in a dance to recover it.

The film received a Genie Award nomination for Best Live Action Short Drama at the 10th Genie Awards in 1989.

References

External links

1988 short films
1988 films
Canadian drama short films
Canadian dance films
Quebec films
1980s Canadian films